Kurt Wilhelm Sebastian Hensel (29 December 1861 – 1 June 1941) was a German mathematician born in Königsberg.

Life and career
Hensel was born in Königsberg, East Prussia (today Kaliningrad, Russia), the son of Julia (née von Adelson) and landowner and entrepreneur Sebastian Hensel. He was the brother of philosopher Paul Hensel. Kurt and Paul's paternal grandparents were painter Wilhelm Hensel and composer Fanny Mendelssohn. Fanny was the sister of Felix Mendelssohn Bartholdy, daughter of Abraham Mendelssohn Bartholdy, and granddaughter of philosopher Moses Mendelssohn, and entrepreneur Daniel Itzig. Both of Hensel's grandmothers and his mother were from Jewish families that had converted to Christianity.

Hensel studied mathematics in Berlin and Bonn, under the mathematicians Leopold Kronecker and Karl Weierstrass.

Later in his life Hensel was a professor at the University of Marburg until 1930. He was also an editor of the mathematical Crelle's Journal. He edited the five-volume collected works of Leopold Kronecker.

Hensel is well known for his introduction of p-adic numbers. First described by him in 1897, they became increasingly important in number theory and other fields during the twentieth century.

Publications
 Theorie der algebraischen Funktionen einer Variabeln und ihre Anwendung auf algebraische Kurven und Abelsche Integrale (zus. mit Georg Landsberg) Teubner, Leipzig 1902
 Theorie der algebraischen Zahlen Teubner, Leipzig 1908
 Zahlentheorie Göschen, Berlin 1913
 Gedächtnisrede auf Ernst Eduard Kummer zu dessen 100. Geburtstag
Über eine neue Begründung der Theorie der algebraischen Zahlen, Jahresbericht DMV, Band 6, 1899

References

External links

 
 
 Helmut Hasse: Kurt Hensel zum Gedächtnis'' in: Journal für die reine und angewandte Mathematik 187 (1949), S. 1-13
 Die Hensel-Familie im Stammbaum der Katzenelnbogen, der Mendelssohns und Bartholdys und ihre Abkömmlinge von 1729 bis ca. 1987
 

1861 births
1941 deaths
19th-century German mathematicians
20th-century German mathematicians
German people of Jewish descent
Number theorists
Scientists from Königsberg
People from the Province of Prussia
University of Bonn alumni
Academic staff of the University of Marburg
Hensel family